The Locus Award for Best Novella is one of a number of Locus Awards given out each year by Locus magazine. Awards presented in a given year are for works published in the previous calendar year.

The first award in this category was presented in 1973.

Winners
Winners are as follows:

References

Novella
American literary awards
Novella awards